Serge Delmas (born 14 May 1947) is a French former football player and manager who played as a winger.

References

1947 births
Living people
French footballers
Association football wingers
Montpellier HSC players
Ligue 2 players
French football managers
Montpellier HSC non-playing staff
Toulouse FC managers
SC Bastia non-playing staff
Nîmes Olympique managers
Ligue 1 managers
Ligue 2 managers